Chad Smith may also refer to:

 Chad Smith (born 1961), drummer for the Red Hot Chili Peppers.
 Chad Smith (athlete) (born 1974), American decathlete
 Chad Smith (soccer) (born 1980), American soccer player
 Chad Smith (politician) (born 1950), Principal Chief of the Cherokee Nation
 Chad Smith (baseball, born 1989), American baseball pitcher
 Chad Smith (baseball, born 1995), American baseball pitcher

See also
 Chad (name)